Eziz Musa (born February 1963) is a Chinese politician of Uyghur ethnicity who is the current vice chairman of the Xinjiang Regional Committee of the Chinese People's Political Consultative Conference.

Biography
Eziz Musa was born in Xayar County, Xinjiang, in February 1963. In September 1980, he was accepted to Xinjiang Bayi Agricultural College (now Xinjiang Agricultural University), majoring in agricultural mechanization. After graduation, he worked in the government of his home-county. In February 1993, he became the deputy magistrate of Xayar County, rising to magistrate of Kuqa County in December 2000. In August 2006, he was admitted to member of the standing committee of the CCP Aksu Prefectural Committee, the prefecture's top authority. In October 2007, he was appointed head of its United Front Work Department. He was deputy head of United Front Work Department of the CCP Xinjiang Uygur Autonomous Region Committee in September 2010, and held that office until March 2012, when he was made governor of Hotan Prefecture. In February 2021, he took office as vice chairman of the Xinjiang Regional Committee of the Chinese People's Political Consultative Conference.

References

1963 births
Living people
People from Xayar County
Xinjiang Agricultural University alumni
Central Party School of the Chinese Communist Party alumni
People's Republic of China politicians from Xinjiang
Chinese Communist Party politicians from Xinjiang
Delegates to the 12th National People's Congress